The welfare state of the United Kingdom began to evolve in the 1900s and early 1910s, and comprises expenditures by the government of the United Kingdom of Great Britain and Northern Ireland intended to improve health, education, employment and social security. The British system has been classified as a liberal welfare state system.

History

The official establishment of the modern welfare state, clear examples of social welfare existed to help the poor and vulnerable within British society. A key date in the Welfare State’s history is 1563; when Queen Elizabeth I’s government encouraged the wealthier members of society to give to the poor, by passing the law:  the 1563 Act For the Relief of the Poor. 

The welfare state in the modern sense was anticipated by the Royal Commission into the Operation of the Poor Laws 1832 which found that the old poor law (a part of the English Poor laws) was subject to widespread abuse and promoted squalor, idleness and criminality in its recipients, compared to those who received private charity. Accordingly, the qualifications for receiving aid were tightened up, forcing many recipients to either turn to private charity or accept employment.

Opinions began to be changed late in the century by reports drawn up by men such as Seebohm Rowntree and Charles Booth into the levels of poverty in Britain. These reports indicated that in the massive industrial cities, between one-quarter and one-third of the population were living below the poverty line.

A 2022 study linked trade shocks during the first globalization (1870–1914) with increased support for a welfare state and reduced support for the Conservative Party.

Liberal reforms

The Liberal Party launched the welfare state in the United Kingdom of Great Britain and Ireland with a series of major welfare reforms in 1906–1914. The reforms were greatly extended over the next forty years.

The minimum wage was introduced in Great Britain in 1909 for certain low-wage industries and expanded to numerous industries, including farm labour, by 1920. However, by the 1920s, a new perspective was offered by reformers to emphasise the usefulness of family allowance targeted at low-income families was the alternative to relieving poverty without distorting the labour market. The trade unions and the Labour Party adopted this view. In 1945, family allowances were introduced; minimum wages faded from view.

The experience of almost total state control during the Second World War had encouraged the belief that the state might be able to solve problems in wide areas of national life.

The Liberal government of 1906–1914 implemented welfare policies concerning three main groups in society: the old, the young and working people.

Beveridge Report and Labour

The aftermath of the First World War boosted demands for social reform, and led to a permanent increase in the role of the state in British society. The end of the war also brought a period of unemployment and poverty, particularly in northern industrial towns, that deepened into the Great Depression by the 1930s.

During the war, the government became much more involved in people's lives via governmental organisation of the rationing of foodstuffs, clothing and fuel and extra milk and meals being given to expectant mothers and children. The wartime coalition, and the introduction of family allowances. Many people welcomed this government intervention and wanted it to go further.

The Beveridge Report of 1942, (which identified five "Giant Evils" in society: squalor, ignorance, want, idleness and disease) essentially recommended a national, compulsory, flat rate insurance scheme which would combine unemployment, widows benefit, child benefit and retirement benefits into one central government support scheme. In regards to healthcare Beveridge preferred the contemporary healthcare system of voluntary and private hospitals "more than that of a taxpayer funded healthcare" believing more people would access healthcare when they need it if they were voluntarily involved in their own healthcare. But it is key to note Beveridge still emphasised that healthcare should be accessible for everyone in the United Kingdom and that people should give what they can according to their means when receiving healthcare in voluntary hospitals.  Beveridge himself was careful to emphasise that unemployment benefits should be held to a subsistence level, and after six months would be conditional on work or training, so as not to encourage abuse of the system. That was however predicated on the concept of the "maintenance of employment" which meant ‘it should be possible to make unemployment of any individual for more than 26 weeks continuously a rare thing in normal times’  and recognised that the imposition of a training condition would be impractical if the unemployed were numbered by the million.  After its victory in the 1945 general election, the Labour Party pledged to eradicate the Giant Evils, and undertook policy measures to provide for the people of the United Kingdom "from the cradle to the grave."

Included among the laws passed were the National Assistance Act 1948, National Insurance Act 1946, and National Insurance (Industrial Injuries) Act 1946.

Impact
This policy resulted in increased expenditure and a widening of what was considered to be the state's responsibility. In addition to the central services of education, health, unemployment and sickness allowances, the welfare state also included the idea of increasing redistributive taxation, increasing regulation of industry, food, and housing (better safety regulations, weights and measures controls, etc.)

The foundation of the National Health Service (NHS) did not involve building new hospitals, but nationalisation of existing municipal provision and charitable foundations. The aim was not to substantially increase provision but to standardise care across the country; indeed William Beveridge believed that the overall cost of medical care would decrease, as people became healthier and so needed less treatment.

However, instead of falling, the cost of the NHS has risen by 4% annually on average due to an ageing population, leading to a reduction in provision. Charges for dentures, and spectacles were introduced in 1951 by the same Labour government that had founded the NHS three years earlier, and prescription charges by the successive Conservative Government were introduced in 1952. In 1988, free eye tests for all were abolished, although they are now free for the over-60s.

After 1979, Margaret Thatcher had laid the post-war Keynesian consensus to rest, in favour of an Individualist and Monetarist Welfare policy, guided by the economy. This Thatcherite consensus was characterised by policies such as Privatisation, driven by her belief in Individualism and Competition. 

Policies differ in different regions of the United Kingdom, but the provision of a welfare state is still a basic principle of government policy in the United Kingdom today. The principle of health care "free at the point of use" became a central idea of the welfare state, which later Conservative governments, although critical of some aspects of the welfare state, did not reverse.

Welfare spending on poor people dropped by 25% under the United Kingdom government austerity programme, cuts to benefits that disabled people receive were significant, Personal Independence Payments and Employment and Support Allowance have both dropped by 10%.  Over half of families living below the breadline have at least one relative with a disability.  Cuts include, tax credits (£4.6bn), universal credit (£3.6bn), child benefit (£3.4bn), disability benefits (£2.8bn), Employment and Support Allowance and Incapacity Benefit (£2bn) and housing benefit (£2.3bn).  Frank Field said, "A £37bn attack has been mounted on the living standards of many of our fellow citizens to such an extent that possibly millions struggle to keep on top of their rent, pay the bills and buy adequate food.  Likewise, an unknown number are unable to clothe their children properly before sending them to school where all too many of these children not only rely on free school dinners as a cornerstone of their diet, but on breakfast and supper clubs as well."

Expenditure
In the financial year 2014/15, state pensions were overwhelmingly the largest governmental welfare expense, costing £86,500,000,000 followed by housing benefit, which accounted for over £20,000,000,000 Expenditure in 2015–16 on benefits included: £2,300,000,000 paid to unemployed people and £27,100,000,000 to people on low incomes, and £27,600,000,000 for personal tax credits.

Criticisms
Conservative thinkers have debated the structural incompatibility between the liberal principles and welfare state's principles. Certain sectors of society have argued that the welfare state creates a disincentive for working and investment. Also suggesting that the welfare state at times does not eliminate the causes of individual contingencies and needs. Economically, the net losers of the welfare state are often more against its values and role within society.

In 2010, the Conservative-Lib Dem coalition government led by David Cameron argued for a reduction of welfare spending in the United Kingdom as part of their programme of austerity. Government ministers have argued that a growing culture of welfare dependency is perpetuating welfare spending, and claim that a cultural change is required to reduce the welfare bill. Public opinion in the UK appears to support a reduction in welfare spending, however commentators have suggested that negative public perceptions are founded on exaggerated assumptions about the proportion of spending on unemployment benefit and the level of benefit fraud.

Figures from the Department for Work and Pensions show that benefit fraud is thought to have cost taxpayers £1.2 billion during 2012–13, up 9% on the year before. This was lower than the £1.5 billion of benefit underpayment due to error.

In some cases, relatives who bring up a child when the parents cannot bring up the child face sanctions and financial penalties, they can be left poor and homeless. There are also widespread complaints from church groups and others that the UK welfare state does insufficient work to prevent poverty, deprivation even hunger. In 2018, food bank usage in the UK reached its highest point on record, with the UK's national food bank provider, Trussel Trust, stating that welfare benefits do not cover basic living costs. The Trussel Trust's figures showed that 1,332,952 three-day emergency food supplies were delivered to people from March 2017 to March 2018. This represented a 13% increase from the previous year.

In 2018 support for raising taxes to finance more provision on health, education and social benefits was the highest it had been since 2002 according to NatCen Social Research. Two-thirds of Labour supporters favoured tax rises and 53% of Conservatives also favoured that.

In 2018 the House of Commons library estimated that by 2021, £37bn less would be spent on working-age social security than in 2010.  Cuts to disability benefits, Personal Independence Payments (PIP) and employment and support allowance (ESA) are noteworthy, they will have fallen by 10%, since 2010.  Over half of families with income below the breadline include at least one person with a disability.  There are also cuts to tax credits Universal Credit child benefit disability benefits ESA and incapacity benefit and housing benefit.  Alison Garnham of the Child Poverty Action Group said, "Cuts and freezes have taken family budgets to the bone as costs rise and there is more pain to come as the two-child limit for tax credits and universal credit, the bedroom tax, the benefit cap and the rollout of universal credit push families deeper into poverty."

Social security payments in 2019 were the lowest they had been since the welfare state was started and food bank use had increased. The Institute for Public Policy Research (IPPR) found £73 per week, (which is standard for Universal Credit that 2.3 million people claim) amounted to 12.5% of median earnings. When unemployment benefit was introduced in 1948 it amounted to 20%. Millions of people in 2019 were "excluded from mainstream society, with the basic goods and amenities needed to survive let alone thrive increasingly out of their grip". The IPPR urged all parties to add an emergency £8.4bn into the welfare system, which has become harder than previous systems because debt deductions are made from payments, there is increasing underpayment and strict sanctions are applied. One in three universal credit claimants are working.

Numerous negative consequences have been attributed to benefit sanctions imposed by the Department for Work and Pensions (DWP), the UK Government department that runs the welfare state in the UK. These include "increased debt and rent arrears, food poverty, crime and worsening physical and mental health. Statistics indicate that in the period of 2011 to 2015 benefit sanctions on people with mental health problems increased by 668%. 19,259 people with mental health problems had benefits stopped in the period of 2014 to 2015, compared to 2,507 people in the period of 2011 to 2012. In 2020, the UK Government admitted that it had made no assessment of the impact that benefit sanctions made on mental health. At the same point in time the Government also refused to assess the impact benefit sanctions have on people’s mental health, which came after repeated warnings on the long-term damage they can cause to people that use the welfare state and to these people's families. Also in 2020, it was reported that at least 69 suicides were linked to the DWP's handling of benefit claims. The National Audit Office (NAO) said the actual number of deaths linked to claims could be much higher than this. It was also reported that the DWP were not looking into information from coroners or families, nor investigating all the reports of suicide made aware to it. In the same year the DWP were accused of a "cover-up" due to destroying approximately 50 reports connected to benefits being stopped. Officials blamed data protection laws for the actions, though the data watchdog denied there was any requirement to destroy the documents by any date. In March 2022, an academic study into whether benefit sanctions are linked to claimant ill-health, including mental illness and suicide was stopped after the DWP and Government ministers refused to release their recorded data on sanctions. 
From a contemporary perspective, in practice, social welfare in the United Kingdom is very different from the ideal version of the welfare state that people may carry. Coverage is extensive, but benefits and services are delivered at a low level. The social protection provided is patchy, and services are tightly rationed.” This opinion appears to be growing in popularity amongst the general population of the UK. This argument does stand when you compare certain statistics with some of Europe’s biggest nations. The UK has a tax revenue, as a share of GDP percentage of 12.55%... this is in this is simply incomparable when matched with France’s (57%), Germany’s (66.66%), and Italy’s (75%). It was also found, in a 2021 study by The Health Foundation, that Britain spends the 6th most money on health care amongst “developed countries.” This figure sits below the EU average and explains why some believe the welfare state is not so successful. It is also a fact that “The UK dedicates roughly one-fifth of its GDP to social spending. That places us 17th – roughly in the middle – of OECD countries” (Whiteford, 2022).

The UK has seen a drastic increase in the usage of foodbanks nationwide: 2.17m food bank users in 2021/22 in comparison to the 41,000 in 2009/10. During the Covid-19 crisis, food insecurity impacted 16% of the population, and some critics argue that government food aid was instigated too late for the elderly and vulnerable. There have also been criticisms of the food parcels given, as reports stated that the parcels lacked nutritional food and instead contained an abundance of processed foods.

Historical statistics on welfare trends

Benefit rates as a percentage of industrial earnings

Note on source, as quoted in the text: "based on statistics of weekly earnings, Employment and Productivity Gazette."

Changes in National Assistance/Supplementary Benefit

 Notes
 (a) As quoted in the text: "the scale is calculated using the average discretionary addition (adjusted to spread winter fuel costs throughout the year) for retirement pensioners. It does not include any allowance for rent. The price index used for the single pensioner is that in the Employment and Productivity Gazette."
 (b) As quoted in the text: "it is assumed that the children are aged four, six, and eleven."

Increases in National Insurance benefits

 Notes
 (a) As quoted by text: "Based on average earnings for adult male manual workers in manufacturing, allowing for income tax and national insurance contributions."
 (b) As quoted by text: "Calculated on the special price index for single pensioner households published by the Employment and Productivity Gazette adjusted for housing expenditure using the housing component of the retail price index. Since a disproportionate number of pensioners have controlled tenancies, this may overstate the increase in prices."
 (c) This column is deflated by use of the Retail Price Index

Social security benefits as a percentage of average earnings

 a,b Man plus dependent wife.
 c Man plus dependent wife on his insurance.
 d Married couple.
 e For one child.

Social policy benefits and earnings under the Labour Government 1964–69

Supplementary benefits rates as a proportion of income

Households dependent on Supplementary Benefit

Changes in real terms in social security benefits

 Notes

 (a) Refers to married couple.
 (b) Refers to man plus dependent wife.
 (c) Refers to man plus wife on his insurance. After 1971 refers to recipients under 80 years old.
 (d) Includes family allowance and tax allowance combined for second child up to 1977, when these were unified into the child benefit.

Percentage change in social security benefits, prices and earnings

 (a) Single person.
 (b) Single pensioner under age 80.
 (c) General index of retail prices.
 (d) Average gross weekly earnings of full-time adult male manual workers. For November 1978, October 1977 to October 1978 increase used.

Unemployment and sickness benefits as a percentage of income 

 (a) After allowing for income tax and national insurance contributions.
 (b) Average earnings of adult male manual workers.
 (c) Earnings Related Supplement calculated using average earnings in October of the relevant tax year.

The real value of social security benefits, 1948–75

See also 

 Social welfare
 Universal basic income in the United Kingdom
 Welfare reform

Housing
 Public housing
 Housing estate
 Council house

References

Bibliography 
 Béland, Daniel, and Alex Waddan. "Conservatives, partisan dynamics and the politics of universality: reforming universal social programmes in the UK and Canada." Journal of Poverty and Social Justice 22#2 (2014): 83–97.
 Calder, Gideon, and Jeremy Gass. Changing Directions of the British Welfare State (University of Wales Press, 2012).
 Esping-Andersen, Gosta; The Three Worlds of Welfare Capitalism, Princeton NJ: Princeton University Press (1990).
 Ferragina, Emanuele and Seeleib-Kaiser, Martin. "Welfare Regime Debate: Past, Present, Futures?" Policy & Politics 39#4 pp. 583–611 (2011).http://www.ingentaconnect.com/content/tpp/pap/2011/00000039/00000004/art00010.**
 Fraser, Derek. The evolution of the British welfare state: a history of social policy since the Industrial Revolution (2nd ed. 1984).
 Gilbert, Bentley B. The Evolution Of National Insurance In Great Britain: The Origins of the Welfare State (1966).
 Harris, Bernard. The origins of the British welfare state: social welfare in England and Wales, 1800–1945 (Palgrave, 2004).
 Häusermann, Silja, Georg Picot, and Dominik Geering. "Review article: Rethinking party politics and the welfare state–recent advances in the literature." British Journal of Political Science 43.01 (2013): 221–40. online
 Hay, Roy. "Employers and social policy in Britain: The evolution of welfare legislation, 1905–14." Social History 2.4 (1977): 435–55.
 Hay, James Roy. Origins of the Liberal Welfare Reforms, 1906–14 (1975) 78pp full text online
 Levine-Clark, Marjorie. Unemployment, Welfare, and Masculine Citizenship: So Much Honest Poverty in Britain, 1870–1930 (Springer, 2015).
 Mommsen, Wolfgang J., and Wolfgang Mock, eds. The emergence of the welfare state in Britain and Germany, 1850–1950 (Taylor & Francis, 1981).
 Slater, Tom. "The myth of “Broken Britain”: welfare reform and the production of ignorance." Antipode 46.4 (2014): 948–69. online
 Weiler, Peter. The New Liberalism: Liberal Social Theory in Great Britain, 1889–1914 (Routledge, 2016).
 Welshman John. Underclass: A History of the Excluded, 1880–2000 (2006) excerpt

External links 
Text of the Beveridge Report
The Welfare State – Never Ending Reform Brief history of the Welfare State by Frank Field (BBC website)
The UK Economy at the Crossroads, research paper from the Center for Economic and Policy Research
Benefit sanctions lead claimants to suicide, crime and destitution, warns damning report. The Independent. Published 25 May 2016.

 
Taxation in the United Kingdom
Social security in the United Kingdom
Child welfare in the United Kingdom

es:Estado del bienestar inglés
ku:Hukmeta jînfirehiyê